The Trail-Crisp Award, of the Linnean Society of London, was established in 1966 and is an amalgamation of The Trail Award and The Crisp Award (both founded in 1910). 
The Trail-Crisp Award is presented at intervals "in recognition of an outstanding contribution to biological microscopy that has been published in the UK".

Recipients

Trail Award

1915: Leonard Doncaster
1920: Helen Gwynne-Vaughan

1937: Carl Pantin
1948: Honor Fell
1954: Irene Manton
1960: L.E.R. Picken

Trail-Crisp Award

See also

 List of biology awards

References

Biology awards
Biology in the United Kingdom
British science and technology awards
Linnean Society of London